Jovan Koprivica (born 15 July 1982) is a Serbian former professional basketball player.

Professional career
Koprivica made a senior team debut for the Beopetrol of YUBA League in 1998. In 2001 he sign for the Crvena zvezda. He won the Radivoj Korać Cup in 2004. He had a lot of problems with injuries which resulted that he was waived by the Zvezda following the conclusion of the 2004–05 season.

After recovering from injury at the end of December 2005, he signed a contract with the Greek team Panellinios until the end of the 2005–06 season. During 2006–07 season he played for the Igokea Partizan from Bosnia and Herzegovina. On 14 November 2007, he signed an "open" contract with the Ergonom from Niš. After that, he spent two seasons in the Ukrainian SuperLeague where he played for the Politekhnika-Halychyna and Kryvbas. He missed entire 2010–11 season.

On 3 November 2011, he signed a contract with OKK Beograd where he finished his playing career in beginning of 2012–13 season.

National team career 
Koprivica was a member of the FR Yugoslavia national youth teams that participated at the 2000 FIBA Europe Under-18 Championship and 2002 FIBA Europe Under-20 Championship.

Post-playing career 
On 28 March 2017, Koprivica got elected as the secretary-general of the Belgrade Sports Association (SSaB). On 5 July 2017, he was appointed as executive director of the 2018 EuroLeague Final Four which be held in Belgrade in May 2018.

Career achievements and awards
 Serbian Cup winner: 1 (with Crvena zvezda: 2003–04)
 Bosnian Cup winner: 1 (with Igokea Partizan: 2006–07)

Personal life 
Koprivica, was born in Belgrade, SR Serbia, SFR Yugoslavia, to former basketball player Žarko Koprivica, who also played for the Crvena zvezda. Jovan's mother is Marija. His younger brother, Nikola, played college basketball for Washington State.

See also
 List of father-and-son combinations who have played for Crvena zvezda

References

External links
 Profile at eurobasket.com
 Profile at realgm.com

1982 births
Living people
ABA League players
Basketball players from Belgrade
Basketball League of Serbia players
BC Politekhnika-Halychyna players
KK Beopetrol/Atlas Beograd players
KK Ergonom players
KK Crvena zvezda players
KK Igokea players
OKK Beograd players
Panellinios B.C. players
Serbian expatriate basketball people in Bosnia and Herzegovina
Serbian expatriate basketball people in Greece
Serbian expatriate basketball people in Ukraine
Serbian men's basketball players
Small forwards